Pua Ulberg (born 15 September 1964) is a Samoan boxer. He competed in the men's light heavyweight event at the 1988 Summer Olympics, and also the 1986 Commonwealth Games.

References

External links
 

1964 births
Living people
Light-heavyweight boxers
Samoan male boxers
Olympic boxers of Samoa
Boxers at the 1988 Summer Olympics
Commonwealth Games competitors for Samoa
Boxers at the 1986 Commonwealth Games
Place of birth missing (living people)